This is the discography for American jazz drummer Shelly Manne.

As leader 

 Here's that Manne (Dee Gee, 1952)
 Shelly Manne Vol. 2 (Contemporary, 1954)
 The West Coast Sound (Contemporary, 1955) – rec. 1953–55. Re-release of the first Shelly Manne & His Men 10-inch LP with additional material.
 Swinging Sounds (Contemporary, 1956)
 More Swinging Sounds (Contemporary, 1956)
 Shelly Manne & His Friends (Contemporary, 1956)
 My Fair Lady (Contemporary, 1956)
 Li'l Abner (Contemporary, 1957) 
 Concerto for Clarinet & Combo (Contemporary, 1957) – rec. 1955-57
 The Gambit (Contemporary, 1958) – rec. 1957-58
 Bells Are Ringing (Contemporary, 1958)
 Shelly Manne & His Men Play Peter Gunn (Contemporary, 1959)
 Son of Gunn!! (Contemporary, 1959)
 At the Black Hawk 1 (Contemporary, 1959)
 At the Black Hawk 2 (Contemporary, 1959)
 At the Black Hawk 3 (Contemporary, 1959)
 At the Black Hawk 4 (Contemporary, 1959)
 "The Three" & "The Two" (Contemporary, 1960) – rec. 1954. Compilation of previously issued 10-inch LPs.
The Proper Time (Contemporary, 1960) – Motion Picture Soundtrack
Ruth Price with Shelly Manne & His Men at the Manne-Hole (Contemporary, 1961) – with Ruth Price
Live! Shelly Manne & His Men at the Manne-Hole (Contemporary, 1961) – Double LP, reissued on 2 separate CDs
Shelly Manne & His Men Play Checkmate (Contemporary, 1961)
Sounds Unheard Of! (with Jack Marshall, Contemporary, 1962) – stereo demonstration record
2-3-4 (with Coleman Hawkins, Impulse!, 1962)
Empathy (with Bill Evans, Verve, 1962)
My Son the Jazz Drummer! (Contemporary, 1962) – reissued as Steps to the Desert in 2004
My Fair Lady with the Un-original Cast (arranged and conducted by Johnny Williams with Jack Sheldon and Irene Kral; Capitol, 1964)
Manne–That's Gershwin! (arranged and directed by John Williams; Capitol, 1965)
Sounds! (with Jack Marshall, Capitol, 1966)
Boss Sounds! (Atlantic, 1966)
Jazz Gunn (Atlantic, 1967)
Perk Up (Concord, 1976]) – rec. 1967
Daktari (Atlantic, 1967)
 Young Billy Young (United Artists, 1969) – Motion Picture Soundtrack
Outside (Contemporary, 1970) – rec. 1969
Alive in London (Contemporary, 1970)
Mannekind (Mainstream, 1972)
Hot Coles (Flying Dutchman, 1975)
The Drum Session with Louie Bellson, Willie Bobo and Paul Humphrey (Philips, 1975)
Rex: Shelly Manne Plays Richard Rogers (Discovery, 1976)
Essence (Galaxy, 1977)
French Concert (with Lee Konitz, Galaxy, 1979) – rec. 1977
Double Piano Jazz Quartet — In Concert at Carmelo's (Trend 1980)
Hollywood Jam (Atlas, 1981)
Fingering (with Monty Alexander and Ray Brown, Atlas, 1981)
One on One (with Russ Freeman, Atlas, 1982)
The Shelly Manne Trio in Zurich (Contemporary, 1984)
 At the Black Hawk 5 (Contemporary, 1991) – rec. 1959

As sideman 
With Chet Baker
 Chet Baker & Strings (Columbia, 1954)
 The Trumpet Artistry of Chet Baker (Pacific Jazz, 1955) – compilation
 Quartet: Russ Freeman/Chet Baker (Pacific Jazz, 1956)
 Pretty/Groovy (World Pacific, 1958) – rec. 1953-54
 Witch Doctor (Contemporary, 1985) – rec. 1953
 Grey December (Pacific Jazz, 1992) – rec. 1953
 West Coast Live – with Stan Getz (Pacific Jazz, 1997)  – live rec. 1954

With Elmer Bernstein
 The Man with the Golden Arm (Decca, 1956)
 Sweet Smell of Success (Decca, 1957)

With Benny Carter
 Jazz Giant (Contemporary, 1958)
 Swingin' the '20s (with Earl Hines, Contemporary, 1958)
 Aspects (United Artists, 1959)

With Teddy Charles
 Collaboration West (Prestige, 1953)
 Evolution (Prestige, 1957) – rec. 1953

With Buddy Collette
 Nice Day with Buddy Collette (Contemporary, 1957)
 At the Cinema! (Mercury, 1959)

With Maynard Ferguson
 Maynard Ferguson's Hollywood Party (EmArcy, 1954)
 Dimensions (EmArcy, 1955)
 Maynard Ferguson Octet (EmArcy, 1955)

With Stan Getz
 West Coast Jazz (Norgran, 1955)
 Hamp and Getz (with Lionel Hampton, Norgran, 1955)
 Stan Getz and the Cool Sounds (Verve, 1957) – rec. 1953-55

With Jimmy Giuffre
 Jimmy Giuffre (Capitol, 1955)
 The Jimmy Giuffre Clarinet (Atlantic, 1956)

With Hampton Hawes
 Four! (Contemporary, 1958)
 Hampton Hawes at the Piano (Contemporary, 1978) – rec. 1976

With Quincy Jones
 Go West, Man! (ABC Paramount, 1957)
 Roots (A&M, 1977)

With Stan Kenton
 Stan Kenton's Milestones (Capitol, 1950) – rec. 1943-47
 Stan Kenton Classics (Capitol, 1952) – rec. 1944-47
 Artistry in Rhythm (Capitol, 1946)
 Encores (Capitol, 1947)
 A Presentation of Progressive Jazz (Capitol, 1947)
 Innovations in Modern Music (Capitol, 1950)
 Stan Kenton Presents (Capitol, 1950)
 City of Glass (Capitol, 1951)
 Popular Favorites by Stan Kenton (Capitol, 1953)
 This Modern World (Capitol, 1953)
 The Kenton Era (Capitol, 1955) – rec. 1940–54
 Kenton with Voices (Capitol, 1957)
 Lush Interlude (Capitol, 1958)
 The Innovations Orchestra (Capitol, 1997) – rec. 1950-51

With Barney Kessel
 Kessel Plays Standards (Contemporary, 1954)
 To Swing or Not to Swing (Contemporary, 1955)
 Easy Like (Contemporary, 1956) – rec. 1953–56
 Music to Listen to Barney Kessel By (Contemporary, 1956)
 The Poll Winners with Ray Brown (Contemporary, 1957)
 The Poll Winners Ride Again! with Ray Brown (Contemporary, 1958)
 Carmen (Contemporary, 1959)
 Some Like It Hot (Contemporary, 1959)
 Poll Winners Three! (Contemporary, 1959)
 Exploring the Scene! (Contemporary, 1960) 
 Let's Cook! (Contemporary, 1962) – rec. 1957

With Peggy Lee
 Things Are Swingin' (Capitol, 1958)
 I Like Men! (Capitol, 1959)
 If You Go (Capitol, 1961)

With Junior Mance
 Get Ready, Set, Jump!!! (Capitol, 1964)
 Straight Ahead! (Capitol, 1964)

With Henry Mancini
 More Music from Peter Gunn (RCA Victor, 1959)
 The Mancini Touch (RCA Victor, 1960)
 Combo! (RCA Victor, 1961)

With Jack Montrose
 Arranged by Montrose (Pacific Jazz, 1954)
 Arranged/Played/Composed by Jack Montrose (Atlantic, 1955)
 Jack Montrose Sextet (Pacific Jazz, 1955)
 Blues and Vanilla (RCA Victor, 1956)

With Oliver Nelson
 Sound Pieces (Impulse!, 1966)
 Skull Session (Flying Dutchman, 1975)
 Stolen Moments (East Wind, 1975)With Art Pepper The Return of Art Pepper (Jazz: West, 1956)
 Living Legend (Contemporary, 1975)
 Popo with Shorty Rogers (Xanadu, 1980) – rec. 1951With Linda Perhacs Parallelograms (Kapps, 1970)With André Previn Pal Joey (Contemporary, 1957)
 West Side Story (Contemporary, 1959)
 The Subterraneans: Soundtrack (MGM, 1960)
 A Different Kind of Blues (with Itzhak Perlman, Angel, 1980)With Shorty Rogers Modern Sounds (Capitol, 1951)
 Shorty Rogers and His Giants (RCA Victor, 1953)
 Cool and Crazy (RCA Victor, 1953)
 Shorty Rogers Courts the Count (RCA Victor, 1954)
 Collaboration with André Previn (RCA Victor, 1954)
 The Swinging Mr. Rogers (Atlantic, 1955)
 Martians Come Back! (Atlantic, 1956) – rec. 1955
 Way Up There (Atlantic, 1957) – rec. 1955
 Afro-Cuban Influence (RCA Victor, 1958)
 The Fourth Dimension in Sound (Warner Bros., 1961)
 Bossa Nova (Reprise, 1962) 
 Martians Stay Home (Atlantic, 1980) – rec. 1955With Sonny Rollins Way Out West (Contemporary, 1957)
 Sonny Rollins and the Contemporary Leaders (Contemporary, 1958)With Pete RugoloIntroducing Pete Rugolo (Columbia, 1954)
Adventures in Rhythm (Columbia, 1954)
Rugolomania (Columbia, 1955)
New Sounds by Pete Rugolo (Harmony, 1957) – rec. 1954–55
Music for Hi-Fi Bugs (EmArcy, 1956)
Out on a Limb (EmArcy, 1956)
Percussion at Work (EmArcy, 1957)
An Adventure in Sound: Reeds in Hi-Fi (Mercury, 1958) – rec. 1956
An Adventure in Sound: Brass in Hi-Fi (Mercury 1958) – rec. 1956
Rugolo Plays Kenton (EmArcy, 1958)
The Music from Richard Diamond (EmArcy, 1959)
10 Trombones Like 2 Pianos (Mercury, 1960)
Ten Trumpets and 2 Guitars (Mercury, 1961)
10 Saxophones and 2 Basses (Mercury, 1961)With Lalo Schifrin 
 Gone with the Wave (Colpix, 1964)
 Music from Mission: Impossible (Dot, 1967)
 There's a Whole Lalo Schifrin Goin' On (Dot, 1968)With Bud Shank Strings & Trombones (Pacific Jazz, 1955)
 Barefoot Adventure (Pacific Jazz, 1961)
 Windmills of Your Mind (Pacific Jazz, 1969)With Tom Waits Small Change (Asylum, 1976)
 Foreign Affairs (Asylum, 1977)With others' Elek Bacsik, Bird and Dizzy – a musical tribute (Flying Dutchman, 1975)
 Don Bagley, Basically Bagley (Dot, 1953)
 Brass Fever, Brass Fever (Impulse!, 1975)
 Kenny Burrell, Heritage (AudioSource, 1980)
 June Christy, The Song Is June! (Capitol, 1958)
 Ornette Coleman, Tomorrow Is the Question! (Contemporary, 1959)
 Sonny Criss, I'll Catch the Sun! (Prestige, 1969)
 Bill Evans, A Simple Matter of Conviction (Verve, 1966)
 Art Farmer, On the Road (Contemporary, 1976)
 Ella Fitzgerald, Whisper Not (Verve, 1967)
 Dizzy Gillespie, The Complete RCA Victor Recordings (Bluebird, 1995) – rec. 1937–1949
 Richard "Groove" Holmes, Six Million Dollar Man,  (RCA/Flying Dutchman, 1975)
 Paul Horn, Plenty of Horn (Dot, 1958)
 Lena Horne, Stormy Weather (RCA Victor, 1957)
 Lena Horne, Lena...Lovely and Alive (RCA Victor, 1962)
 The Jazz Afro-Cuban Beat, Hot Skins (Interlude, 1959)
 Hank Jones, Just for Fun (Galaxy, 1977)
 John Klemmer, Constant Throb (Impulse!, 1971)
 Jimmy Knepper, Jimmy Knepper in L.A. (Discomate, 1978) – rec. 1977
 Andy LaVerne, Captain Video (Atlas, 1981)
 John Lewis, Kansas City Breaks (Finesse, 1982)
 Johnny Mandel, I Want to Live (United Artists, 1958)
 Barry Manilow, 2:00 AM Paradise Cafe (Arista, 1984) 
 Warne Marsh, Live in Hollywood (Xanadu, 1979) – rec. 1952
 Bill Mays, Tha's Delights (Trend, 1983)
 Howard McGhee, Maggie's Back in Town!! (Contemporary, 1961)
 Bette Midler, Broken Blossom (Atlantic, 1977)
 Gerry Mulligan, I Want to Live (United Artists, 1958)
 Jack Nitzsche, Heart Beat: Soundtrack (Capitol, 1980)
 Red Rodney, Superbop (Muse, 1974)
 Joe Sample and Ray Brown, The Three (East Wind, 1975)
 George Shearing, Out of the Woods (Capitol, 1965) – rec. 1964
 Zoot Sims, The Swinger (Pablo, 1979)
 Sonny Stitt, Dumpy Mama (Flying Dutchman, 1975)
 Dan Terry, The Complete Vita Recordings of Dan Terry (Vita, 1952)
 Captain & Tennille, Dream (A&M, 1978)
 Cal Tjader, Breathe Easy (Galaxy, 1978) – rec. 1977
 Joe Williams, With Love (Temponic, 1972)
 Nancy Wilson, The Sound of Nancy Wilson'' (Capitol, 1968)

References 

Discographies of American artists
Jazz discographies